Two Women (Dve zhenshchiny) is a 2014 Russian drama film directed by Vera Glagoleva, starring Ralph Fiennes and Sylvie Testud. It is based on Ivan Turgenev's 1872 play A Month in the Country (originally written as Two Women in 1855). The film received mixed reviews from critics.

Plot
At the heart of the play lies the love quadrangle. Natalya Petrovna, the wife of the rich landowner Arkady Sergeich Islaev, falls in love with Alexey Nikolayevich Belyaev - a student, teacher Kolya Islaeva.

Mikhail Aleksandrovich Rakitin - a friend of the family, has long loved Natalya Petrovna. Verochka - a pupil of Natalya Petrovna also falls in love with Kolya's teacher. Belyaev and Rakitin eventually leave the estate ...

Cast
 Anna Vartanyan-Astrakhantseva (ru) as Natalya Petrovna Islaeva
 Ralph Fiennes as Mikhail Aleksandrovich Rakitin
 Aleksandr Baluev as Arkady Sergeich Islaev
 Sylvie Testud as Elisavetta Bogdanovna
 Anna Levanova as Verochka
 Nikita Volkov as Alexey Nikolayevich Belyaev
 Larisa Malevannaya as Anna Semenovna Islaeva
 Bernd Moss as Schaaf
 Sergey Yushkevich as Ignaty Shpigelsky
 Vasiliy Mishchenko as Bolshentsov
 Anna Nahapetova as Katya

Reception
Two Women has an approval rating of 89% on review aggregator website Rotten Tomatoes, based on 9 reviews, and an average rating of 6.00/10. It also has a score of 54 out of 100 on Metacritic, based on 4 critics, indicating "mixed or average reviews".

Clarence Tsui of The Hollywood Reporter wrote:
Fiennes' superficial turn (in more ways than one, as his lines ended up overdubbed by a Russian voice actor) is hampered more by circumstances than ability: rather than playing on the multiple possibilities underlining Turgenev's once-transgressive comedy of manners, actress-turned-filmmaker Vera Glagoleva's 21st century take is a po-faced, straitjacketed affair, as she (and her screenwriters Svetlana Grudovich and Olga Pogodina-Kuzima) play out the entangled relationships as excessively affected period drama. While certainly lushly mounted, Two Women is at best a piece of dated heritage cinema, and at worst cliche-ridden pomp.

The film won the Best Feature Film award at the 3rd Hanoi International Film Festival.

References

External links
 Official website
 
 

2014 drama films
2014 films
Russian films based on plays
Films based on works by Ivan Turgenev
Films set in the 19th century
Russian drama films
2010s Russian-language films
Films based on Russian novels